XenMan is a Xen Hypervisor management tool with a graphical user interface that allows a user to perform the standard set of operations (start, stop, pause, kill, shutdown, reboot, snapshot, etc...) in addition to some higher level operations such as the creation of a guest domain (which includes the creation of the configuration file, the retrieval of appropriate kernels and initial ram disks, as well as the starting of the domain) in one single operation. The goal is to create a graphical management tool that fulfills all the Xen management needs both a novice and advanced user may require.

The application is developed in the python programming language, uses the gtk widget set and is released under the GPL.

External links
XenMan sourceforge project page.
XenMan screenshot.

Virtualization software